SAEP  (Spanish: Servicios Aéreos Especializados en Transportes Petroleros) is a Colombian cargo airline that specializes in oil transport. It was founded in 1980, and still operates today from the city of Bogota.

History
SAEP was founded on May 19, 1980, in the heart of Bogota. Its early planes were Douglas DC-3s and then later the company decided to switch to Antonov An-32s.

Fleet
This the current active fleet of SAEP.

References

External links

Cargo airlines
Airlines established in 1980
Airlines of Colombia